Selfridge is a town in Sioux County, North Dakota, United States and on the Standing Rock Indian Reservation. Selfridge was founded in 1911. The population was 127 at the 2020 census. Other settlements near this town include Fort Yates and Porcupine. Previous settlements that have since dissolved are Maple Leaf and Chadwick.

Geography

School System
The Selfridge Public School District system consists of two main school buildings. Selfridge Elementary serves grades K-6. The high school serves grades 7-12. The school system enrolls around 100 students.

The schools were built in the 1950s to replace the old main school building. The elementary school was once a private school for the St. Philomena Catholic Church.

Local Business
The town is now served by the Farmers Union Oil Co. (Cenex), the Branding Iron Bar & Steakhouse, USDA (United States Department of Agriculture), Cedar Soil Conservation District, the senior center, the United States Postal Service, and numerous churches.

History

Selfridge was settled in 1911 along a Milwaukee Road branch line that diverged from the railroad's Pacific Extension transcontinental route in McLaughlin, South Dakota and ran to New England, North Dakota. The first depot was a stationary boxcar moved into Selfridge in 1917 by the railroad on a flatcar; G.E. Langbein became the first depot agent. The boxcar-depot was in pretty deplorable condition upon arrival; it took quite a bit of work to fix it up. In the early days, trains were used extensively, for long distance travel by Selfridge residents and continued until the later 1940s. Selfridge was dependent on the railroad in the early years. Everything came in by train: groceries, lumber, fruit, coal, meat, machinery, mail and even ice. The city shipped all its produce out by train also. Again, the mail, livestock, grain dairy products etc. The trains were a vital part of Selfridge as a growing community.

The first business, a general store, was started in 1911, followed shortly by the Sioux Lumber Company later in 1911. This made for access to building supplies for other businesses and homes which followed. Some of the first homes were crude shanties until the residents could later build their homes, such as the J.K. Wead home and the B.L. Smestad home. These are still being lived in by families today.

Farmers came to the Selfridge area hoping to make their fortune in flax. The area was open range and cattle had to be herded day and night. The area had good farming ground and excellent ranching hills. Horses were used for pulling wagons and for farming and most of the prairie was broken up with walking plows.
Travel was slow and difficult due to crude prairie trails and lack of roads. Good roads weren't really built until the 1930s when W.P.A. was put into effect. The roads were then built with horses and crude machinery.

For the first eight years after it was founded, Selfridge existed as an unorganized community without the benefit of municipal ordinances and local supervision—a real "wild west" sort of environment. Before they incorporated to become a village, the residents of Selfridge fought a losing struggle to have Selfridge designated as the county seat before Sioux County became separated from Morton County. History repeated itself, when again in the 1950s the residents tried to have the county seat relocated from Fort Yates to Selfridge because it is more centrally located. Both times were disappointing defeats.

In 1925, the City of Selfridge had 51 homes and 63 business places.
It contained 2 churches, 4 schools, 3 elevators, 2 garages, 3 implement
dealers, 4 filling stations, 2 welding shops, 1 long distance phone, 1 lawyer,
1 pool hall, 2 banks, 1 public hall, 1 picture show, 4 general stores, 3
grocery and meat stores, 1 blacksmith shop, 1 feed barn, 1 rooming house, 2
restaurants, 4 real estate offices, 2 oil stations, 1 hotel, 1 hardware, 1
newspaper, 1 drug store, 1 barber shop, 2 cream stations, 3 contractors, 1
painter, 2 lumber yards, 2 confectioneries, 1 millinery shop, 1 footlocker, and 1 electric, and
power & light company.

By 1930 the city had more than doubled its population.

During the depression years of the thirties, many local men and area farmers
supported their families by working on W.P.A. (Works Progress Administration). The pay was anywhere from $25 to $42 per month depending on the type of work and job and whether the men furnished their own teams of horses. The city park was started and planted with grass and trees. The City Auditorium was built and sidewalks installed. National Youth Association (NYA) gave many of our young people jobs. They earned $6.00 a month.

A volunteer fire department
has always been in existence in Selfridge, but never formally organized until
1973. Balls and fundraisers were held often to raise money for equipment. Many
of the Selfridge business places and homes have been lost to major fires
through the years.

Farming practices in the Selfridge area have changed drastically over the past 100 years—trash cover on summer fallow, a faster coverage of all stages of farming including seeding, summer fallow, harvesting, etc., as well as chemicals used on weed and insect control, seed variety and treatment. The Cedar Soil Conservation Office should be given credit here as they assisted in dam, dugouts, dike building, planning, surveying and financially. Modern farming practices have cut down on farm labor costs but increased in farm management costs. Farmers and ranchers now spend long hours with the calculators and computers figuring out how to get the best production for the least cost.

In the late '50s and early '60s, Selfridge hit its peak population. Much
construction and building was going on in this area. By the 1970s the Selfridge population started going down as did the population of most small towns. People were better able to purchase away from home at a cheaper price.

And the young people started leaving the community. During the later years of 1970 it was even feared by the community that it might have to close the doors on its school. This was the trend across the whole country—people moving from rural to urban settings.

Transportation
The main access to the town is using North Dakota Highway 6. The Milwaukee Road line that ran through the town was abandoned in 1983, leaving Selfridge without railway access.

Demographics

2010 census
As of the census of 2010, there were 160 people, 59 households, and 36 families residing in the town. The racial makeup of the town was 33.1% White, 0.6% African American, 58.1% Native American, 1.3% Asian, and 6.9% from two or more races. Hispanic or Latino of any race were 2.5% of the population.

There were 59 households, of which 32.2% had children under the age of 18 living with them, 25.4% were married couples living together, 23.7% had a female householder with no husband present, 11.9% had a male householder with no wife present, and 39.0% were non-families. 30.5% of all households were made up of individuals, and 6.8% had someone living alone who was 65 years of age or older. The average household size was 2.71 and the average family size was 3.28.

The median age in the town was 34.5 years. 31.2% of residents were under the age of 18; 9.5% were between the ages of 18 and 24; 21.3% were from 25 to 44; 22.5% were from 45 to 64; and 15.6% were 65 years of age or older. The gender makeup of the town was 49.4% male and 50.6% female.

2000 census
As of the census of 2000, there were 223 people, 71 households, and 54 families residing in the town. The population density was 830.4 people per square mile (318.9/km2). There were 85 housing units at an average density of 316.5 per square mile (121.6/km2). The racial makeup of the town was 39.91% White, 59.19% Native American, 0.45% Pacific Islander, and 0.45% from two or more races. Hispanic or Latino of any race were 2.24% of the population.

There were 71 households, out of which 46.5% had children under the age of 18 living with them, 36.6% were married couples living together, 28.2% had a female householder with no husband present, and 23.9% were non-families. 19.7% of all households were made up of individuals, and 2.8% had someone living alone who was 65 years of age or older. The average household size was 3.14 and the average family size was 3.48.

In the town the population was spread out, with 40.8% under the age of 18, 9.4% from 18 to 24, 23.8% from 25 to 44, 20.2% from 45 to 64, and 5.8% who were 65 years of age or older. The median age was 24 years. For every 100 females, there were 89.0 males. For every 100 females age 18 and over, there were 83.3 males.

The median income for a household in the town was $24,375, and the median income for a family was $23,594. Males had a median income of $21,875 versus $18,750 for females. The per capita income for the town was $8,824. About 21.6% of families and 29.4% of the population were below the poverty line, including 38.6% of those under the age of eighteen and 31.6% of those 65 or over.

Climate
This climatic region is typified by large seasonal temperature differences, with warm to hot (and often humid) summers and cold (sometimes severely cold) winters. According to the Köppen Climate Classification system, Selfridge has a humid continental climate, abbreviated "Dfb" on climate maps.

References

History Reference: https://web.archive.org/web/20110716003209/http://selfridge-nd.com/Selfridge_History.html

Populated places established in 1911
1911 establishments in North Dakota
Cities in North Dakota
Cities in Sioux County, North Dakota